We Have Only One Life is a 1958 Greek comedy film directed by George Tzavellas.

Cast 
 Yvonne Sanson - Bibi Koumoundouropoulou
 Dimitris Horn - Kleon
 Vasilis Avlonitis - Haralabos Bazoukas
 Christos Tsaganeas - bank manager
 Periklis Christoforidis - Manolis
 Lavrentis Dianellos - barba-Fotis
 Koulis Stoligkas - dancing competition judge
 Dionysis Papagiannopoulos - Mr. Daouglou
 Giorgos Damasiotis - Mihalis
 Stavros Iatridis - Paparakis
 Giannis Ioannidis - supervisor
 Thanos Tzeneralis - bank client
 Rallis Angelidis - lawyer
 Charis Kamilli - Kitsa
 Panagiotis Karavousanos - neighbour
 Nikos Fermas - night watcher
 Eberhard Winchenbach - Hengelmann
 Joly Garbi
 Niki Linardou - jewellery store seller
 Kostas Gousgounis - coffee shop owner

References

External links 

1958 comedy films
Films scored by Manos Hatzidakis
Greek comedy films
1950s Greek-language films